Alwan was an Arabic-language newspaper in Sudan. It had a daily circulation of about 16,000 as of 2011 and generally supported al-Turabi’s PCP. It was shut down in 2020 by the Sudanese government following the 2019 coup.

References 

Arabic-language newspapers
Defunct newspapers published in Sudan